...Somewhere More Familiar is the second studio album by the American alternative rock band Sister Hazel, released in 1997 by Universal Records. Although it only peaked at #47 in the U.S., it has gone platinum selling over a million copies. This album contained a re-recorded and more well known version of "All for You", and is Sister Hazel's biggest hit to date, hitting #11 on the Billboard Hot 100. "We'll Find It" was included in the soundtrack for the film The Wedding Planner, starring Jennifer Lopez and Matthew McConaughey. The title of the album comes from a lyric in said song.

Track listing 
All songs written and arranged by Sister Hazel (Ken Block, Andrew Copeland, Ryan Newell, Jett Beres, Mark Trojanowski)

Personnel

Sister Hazel 
Ken Block: Lead Vocal, Acoustic Guitar
Andrew Copeland: Rhythm Guitar, Harmony Vocals
Ryan Newell: Lead & Slide Guitar, Backing Vocals
Jett Beres: Bass, Backing Vocals
Mark Trojanowski: Drums, Percussion

Additional musicians
Darwin Martin: Organ
Kevin Paige: Organ, Piano
Todd Schietroma: Additional Percussion

Production 
Produced By Paul Ebersold
Engineered By Paul Ebersold & Erik Flettrich; assistant engineers: Matt Martone & Pete Matthews
Mixed By Paul Ebersold, Erik Flettrich & Brian Malouf
Mastered By Greg Calbi

Charts

Certification

References 

1997 albums
Sister Hazel albums
Universal Records albums